The 1996 season was Molde's 21st season in the top flight of Norwegian football. This season Molde competed in Tippeligaen, Norwegian Cup and the 1996–97 UEFA Cup.

In Tippeligaen, Molde finished in 8th position, 26 points behind winners Rosenborg. 

Molde participated in the 1996 Norwegian Cup. They were knocked out in the fourth round by Kongsvinger with the score 0–3.

Squad

Friendlies

Competitions

Tippeligaen

Results summary

Positions by round

Results

League table

Norwegian Cup

UEFA Cup

Qualifying round

Squad statistics

Appearances and goals

               

|}

Goalscorers

See also
Molde FK seasons

References

External links
nifs.no

1996
Molde